South Vienna is a village in Clark County, Ohio, United States. The population was 384 at the 2010 census. It is part of the Springfield, Ohio Metropolitan Statistical Area.

The South Vienna Corn Festival is well known throughout the area, and is held on the weekend after Labor Day. The village also has the distinction of having Permit #1, issued by the State of Ohio for traffic lights.

History
South Vienna was originally called Vienna, and under the latter name was platted in 1833. A post office called Vienna Cross Roads was established in 1840, and the name was changed to South Vienna in 1909.

Geography
South Vienna is located at  (39.927812, -83.612728).

Demographics

2010 census
As of the census of 2010, there were 384 people, 148 households, and 102 families living in the village. The racial makeup of the village was 90.4% White, 0.8% African American, 0.5% Native American, 0.5% Asian, 5.7% from other races, and 2.1% from two or more races. Hispanic or Latino of any race were 7.8% of the population.

There were 148 households, of which 35.1% had children under the age of 18 living with them, 48.0% were married couples living together, 16.2% had a female householder with no husband present, 4.7% had a male householder with no wife present, and 31.1% were non-families. 25.0% of all households were made up of individuals, and 8.8% had someone living alone who was 65 years of age or older. The average household size was 2.59 and the average family size was 2.98.

The median age in the village was 40.7 years. 26.8% of residents were under the age of 18; 8.9% were between the ages of 18 and 24; 20.4% were from 25 to 44; 34.4% were from 45 to 64; and 9.6% were 65 years of age or older. The gender makeup of the village was 48.4% male and 51.6% female.

2000 census
As of the census of 2000, there were 469 people, 166 households, and 131 families living in the village. The population density was 1,157.8 people per square mile (441.7/km). There were 173 housing units at an average density of 427.1 per square mile (162.9/km). The racial makeup of the village was 97.65% White, 0.21% African American, 0.85% from other races, and 1.28% from two or more races. Hispanic or Latino of any race were 2.13% of the population.

There were 166 households, out of which 41.0% had children under the age of 18 living with them, 60.2% were married couples living together, 15.7% had a female householder with no husband present, and 20.5% were non-families. 16.9% of all households were made up of individuals, and 5.4% had someone living alone who was 65 years of age or older. The average household size was 2.83 and the average family size was 3.16.

In the village, the population was spread out, with 32.6% under the age of 18, 8.1% from 18 to 24, 28.4% from 25 to 44, 19.6% from 45 to 64, and 11.3% who were 65 years of age or older. The median age was 32 years. For every 100 females there were 92.2 males. For every 100 females age 18 and over, there were 87.0 males.

The median income for a household in the village was $40,625, and the median income for a family was $51,875. Males had a median income of $36,389 versus $25,833 for females. The per capita income for the village was $17,271. About 8.5% of families and 8.2% of the population were below the poverty line, including 1.3% of those under age 18 and 17.9% of those age 65 or over.

Notable people
 Chris Daugherty - the winner of Survivor: Vanuatu
 Harvey Haddix - baseball pitcher lived in South Vienna during his playing career in the 1960s.
 Jenny Mae - indie rock singer-songwriter

References

External links

 Village website

Villages in Clark County, Ohio
Villages in Ohio
1833 establishments in Ohio
Populated places established in 1833